Lunteren is a railway station located in Lunteren, Netherlands.

History
The station was opened on 1 May 1902 and is located on the Valleilijn. The station closed on 7 September 1944 and re-opened 20 May 1951. The station and services are currently operated by Connexxion, previously operated by Nederlandse Spoorwegen.

The train services pass here as the line is single track.

Train services
, the following local train services call at this station:

Stoptrein: Amersfoort - Barneveld - Ede-Wageningen

Bus services
Bus line 505 stops at the station.

References

External links

Dutch public transport travel planner 

Railway stations in Ede, Netherlands
Railway stations opened in 1902
Railway stations closed in 1944
Railway stations opened in 1951
Railway stations on the Valleilijn